Oz is a surname. Notable people with the surname include:

 Amos Oz (19392018), Israeli author
 Avraham Oz (born 1944), Israeli theatre professor
 Daphne Oz (born 1986), American author, chef, and television host
 Doğan Öz (19341978), Turkish prosecutor assassinated in the line of duty
 Frank Oz (born 1944), American film director, actor, and puppeteer
 Kobi Oz (born 1969), Israeli singer with the Teapacks
 Lisa Oz (born 1963), American author, television personality, and radio personality
 Mehmet Oz (born 1960), known as Dr. Oz, Turkish-American surgeon, television host, and politician
 Noyan Öz (born 1991), Turkish-German footballer

See also 

 Avraham Katz-Oz (born 1934), Israeli politician
 Fania Oz-Salzberger (born 1960), Israeli historian and professor

Hebrew-language surnames
Turkish-language surnames